Elizabeth de Clare, 11th Lady of Clare (16 September 1295 – 4 November 1360) was the heiress to the lordships of Clare, Suffolk, in England and Usk in Wales. She was the youngest of the three daughters of Gilbert de Clare, 6th Earl of Hertford and Joan of Acre, and sister of Gilbert de Clare, who later succeeded as the 7th Earl. She is often referred to as Elizabeth de Burgh, due to her first marriage to John de Burgh. Her two successive husbands were Theobald II de Verdun (of the Butler-de Verdun family) and Roger d'Amory.

Marriages
Elizabeth de Clare married three times and had three children; one by each husband. Her father had been one of England's wealthiest and most powerful nobles, and her mother was a daughter of King Edward I of England. When Elizabeth's only brother Gilbert, 7th Earl of Hertford was killed at the Battle of Bannockburn in 1314 aged only 23 and leaving no surviving issue, his property, estimated to be worth £6,000/year, was equally divided between his three full sisters, Elizabeth, Eleanor and Margaret. This made Elizabeth one of the greatest heiresses in England. Her maternal uncle, King Edward II, recalled her to England so he could select a husband for her. She left Ireland for good in 1316, leaving behind her young son, William.

First marriage
She accompanied her brother Gilbert to Ireland for their double wedding to two siblings: the son and daughter of the Earl of Ulster. Elizabeth married John de Burgh on 30 September 1308. He was the heir to the Earl of Ulster, and Elizabeth could expect to be a countess in due course. She gave birth to their only child, a son, in 1312; he would become William Donn de Burgh, 3rd Earl of Ulster. Only a year later, her husband John was unexpectedly killed in a minor skirmish. A widow, Elizabeth remained in Ireland until the death of her brother, Gilbert, at the Battle of Bannockburn compelled her immediate return to England in July 1314.

Second marriage

Edward II placed her in Bristol Castle, but his plans to marry her to one of his supporters were dashed in February 1316, when Elizabeth was abducted from Bristol by Theobald II de Verdun, the former Justiciar of Ireland. He and Elizabeth had been engaged before she was called back to England. She was Lady Verdun for only six months when Theobald died on 27 July 1316, at Alton, Staffordshire, from typhoid. He left behind three daughters from a prior marriage and Elizabeth, who was pregnant. She fled to Amesbury Priory, where she stayed under the protection of her aunt Mary de Burgh, who was a nun there, and where Theobald's posthumous daughter, Isabel de Verdun (named for the Queen), was born on 21 March 1317.

Third marriage

Just a few weeks later after Isabel's birth, Edward II married Elizabeth to Sir Roger D'Amory, Lord D'Amory, Baron of Amory in Ireland. D'Amory had been a knight in her brother's service who rose to prominence as a favourite of Edward II. Now married to him, Elizabeth was caught up in the political upheavals of her uncle's reign. She gave birth to another daughter, Elizabeth, in May 1318. Roger was reckless and violent, and made a deadly enemy of his brother-in-law, Hugh Despenser the younger. D'Amory switched sides, joining the Marcher Lords led by Roger Mortimer and Thomas, Earl of Lancaster in the rebellion known as the Despenser War. He died of his wounds at Tutbury Castle, Staffordshire after 16 March 1322, having been captured by the royalist forces at the Battle of Boroughbridge where the rebels were soundly defeated. Elizabeth was captured at Usk Castle and imprisoned at Barking Abbey with her children by the victorious faction.

Loss and recovery of property

Elizabeth's brother-in-law, Hugh Despenser the younger, lord of Glamorgan, became a particular favourite of King Edward II. With the support of the king he began to take over the adjacent lordships in south Wales, with the aim to consolidate a huge landholding by fair means or foul. He concentrated on the lordships held by his sisters-in law and their husbands: Margaret and Hugh D'Audley (lordship of Gwynllwg or Newport), and Elizabeth and Roger Damory (lordship of Usk). Faced with this threat, the Marcher lords of south Wales, led by Damory, rose up against Despenser in May 1321 capturing his castles at Caerphilly and Cardiff. Their success contributed to the king's banishment of Hugh and his father on 14 August that year. This success was only short-lived as the king recalled the Despensers in October 1321 and launched a counter-offensive against the Marcher lords and their allies. Elizabeth was taken prisoner at Usk Castle in January 1322, and imprisoned in Barking Abbey, London, with her husband dying two months later. Elizabeth was forced by the king to exchange her lordship of Usk with Despenser's less-valuable lordship of Gower. 

The rebellion of Queen Isabella and her lover Roger Mortimer, saw King Edward II and Hugh Despenser flee to south Wales in October 1326. By this date Elizabeth seems to have been back in residence at Usk Castle, and she regained this lordship after Despenser's execution. She held a very elaborate Christmas feast that year in Usk Castle, perhaps partly in celebration of her adversary's death, for which the long list of food and drink survives (see the National Archives PRO E101/91/14). She also undertook building works at Usk and nearby Llangibby Castles, where she would entertain her friends, Marie de St Pol, countess of Pembroke, first amongst these. She stayed at Usk from October 1348 until April 1350, perhaps to escape the Black Death.

Later life 
After Damory's death, Elizabeth de Clare never remarried and styled herself the 'Lady of Clare' after her principal estate in Suffolk. She also had a residence at Anglesey Abbey, Cambridgeshire, Great Bardfield, Essex, and in 1352 she built a London house in the precinct of the Franciscan convent of Minoresses, Aldgate. A good idea of her lifestyle in the last 25 years of her life can be taken from the extensive survival of her household and other records. These threw light on the activities of and provision of food and drink for the household (numbering up to 100 people) of one of the richest and most influential women of the fourteenth century. Amongst the records are the work of her personal goldsmith in 1333, and she also lists her alms giving and the patronage towards her favourite religious houses, the priories at Clare, Anglesey, and Walsingham, and Denny Abbey. Her most important and long-lasting foundation was Clare College, Cambridge. This began when she was asked to support University Hall, founded by Richard de Badew, in 1326. When Richard handed over his rights as patron to Elizabeth in 1346, she made further grants and it became known as Clare Hall.

Death

Elizabeth de Burgh died on 4 November 1360 and was buried at the convent of the Minoresses following a funeral costing £200. Her tomb has not survived but must have been elaborate. Her will with its extensive bequests is published along with her household records. Elizabeth de Clare's eldest daughter, Isabel de Verdun married Henry de Ferrers, 2nd Lord Ferrers of Groby, and her younger daughter, Elizabeth d'Amory, married John Bardolf, 3rd Lord Bardolf of Wormegay, Knight Banneret (1314–1363). Her son William, 3rd Earl of Ulster married Maud of Lancaster, by whom he had a daughter, Elizabeth de Burgh, 4th Countess of Ulster. Elizabeth became the future wife of Edward III's second son Lionel of Antwerp, 1st Duke of Clarence. William had been murdered in Ireland in 1333, 27 years before her own death on 4 November 1360.

Ancestry

References

1295 births
1360 deaths
People from Acre, Israel
Founders of English schools and colleges
Elizabeth
13th-century English people
13th-century English women
14th-century English people
14th-century English women